Volkert Kraeft (born 7 August 1941 in Timmendorfer Strand) is a German television actor.

Selected filmography
 A Handful of Heroes (1967)
 Derrick: Kalkutta (1976, TV series episode)
  (1976, TV film)
 The Buddenbrooks (1979, TV series)
  (1980, TV film)
 Vom Webstuhl zur Weltmacht (1983, TV series)
  (1988, TV series)
  (1989)
  (1989, TV film)

External links

Eichhorn Agency Düsseldorf 
Short Biography 

1941 births
Living people
German male television actors
German male film actors
20th-century German male actors
21st-century German male actors